Acacia microneura is a shrub belonging to the genus Acacia and the subgenus Juliflorae endemic to southern Western Australia.

Description
The resinous and angled branchlets have small white hairs between the angles. The phyllodes have a central nerve and broader marginal nerves. It flowers from August to October producing yellow flowers. The simple inflorescences occur singly or in pairs per node.

Taxonomy
The species was first formally described by the botanist Carl Meissner as part of Johann Georg Christian Lehmann's work Leguminosae. Plantae Preissianae. It was reclassified as Racosperma microneurum by Leslie Pedley in 2003 then transferred back to the genus Acacia in 2006. The only other synonym is Acacia subangularis, but the plant is also often confused with Acacia lineolata.

Distribution
It is native to a small area in the Great Southern region of Western Australia around the town of Cranbrook where it is found in disturbed areas and heathlands where it grows in sandy-loamy soils over and around granite.

See also
List of Acacia species

References

microneura
Acacias of Western Australia
Plants described in 1844
Taxa named by Carl Meissner